This is a list of all the golfers who have won ten or more official events on the U.S.-based PGA Tour Champions (known as the Senior PGA Tour from 1980–2002 and Champions Tour from 2003–2015), the leading golf tour in the world for men aged 50 and above. The list is up to date as of February 19, 2023.

Members of the World Golf Hall of Fame are indicated by H.

References

Champions Tour wins
Champions Tour wins
Champions Tour wins